Statistics of National Association Foot Ball League in season 1917-18.

League standings

References
 NATIONAL ASSOCIATION FOOT BALL LEAGUE (RSSSF)

1917-18
1917–18 domestic association football leagues
1917–18 in American soccer